Chuckerbutty is a surname. Notable people with the surname include:

Oliphant Chuckerbutty (1884–1960), English composer and organist 
Soorjo Coomar Goodeve Chuckerbutty ( 1826–1874), Indian surgeon